Halsall is a civil parish in the West Lancashire district of Lancashire, England.  It contains 17 buildings that are recorded in the National Heritage List for England as designated listed buildings.  Of these, one is listed at Grade I, the highest of the three grades, and the others are at Grade II, the lowest grade.  The parish contains the villages of Halsall and Shirdley Hill, and is otherwise rural.  The Leeds and Liverpool Canal runs through the parish, and the listed buildings associated with it are four bridges and a milestone.  The other listed buildings include a church and structures in the churchyard, houses, a ha-ha, a ruined building, a boundary stone, and a war memorial.


Key

Buildings

References

Citations

Sources

Lists of listed buildings in Lancashire
Buildings and structures in the Borough of West Lancashire